The Rascals' discography is diverse, with numerous compilations. Their early—and primary—output was all recorded on Atlantic Records and produced with Arif Mardin. After the band left Atlantic in 1971, they recorded two albums for Columbia with various line-ups other than the original four members of the group.

Albums

Selected compilations
There are many vinyl, tape and CD compilations and reissues by a multitude of companies in the U.S., Germany, Japan and elsewhere.

Singles

References

External Links
 

Discographies of American artists